Awad Abdel Nabi (born 9 May 1953) is an Egyptian basketball player. He competed in the 1972 and 1976 Summer Olympics.

References

1953 births
Living people
Basketball players at the 1972 Summer Olympics
Basketball players at the 1976 Summer Olympics
Egyptian men's basketball players
Olympic basketball players of Egypt